Rukometni klub Berane is a handball club from Berane, Montenegro. RK Berane is former champion of Montenegro.

History

RK Berane was formed in 1949, under the name ORK Ivangrad. For the first time in history, Berane gained promotion to the First League at the 1995, under the name Raj Banka. During the start of the 21st century, Berane became permanent member of the First League of Serbia and Montenegro.

After the Montenegrin independence, Berane played in the Montenegrin First League. Their biggest success was the title of national championship in the season 2007/08. A year earlier, RK Berane became the winner of the first season of Montenegrin Cup.

Due to financial problems and the destruction of their stadium in February of 2012,Berane was relegated from the First League after the season 2012/13. After that, club is transformed and started with competing in the Second Montenegrin League 2013/14.

Trophies

Champion of Montenegro (1) 
2008.
Winner of the Montenegrin Cup (1) 
 2007.

First League seasons

In the era of FR Yugoslavia/Serbia and Montenegro, RK Berane participated in the First League during the eight seasons: 1995/96, 1999/00, 2000/01, 2001/02, 2002/03, 2003/04, 2004/05, 2005/06.

After the Montenegrin independence, Berane played in the Montenegrin First League during the seasons 2006/07, 2007/08, 2008/09, 2009/10, 2010/11, 2011/12, 2012/13, 2014/15.

European Cups

Berane played few seasons in the EHF European competitions:
2006/07 - EHF Challenge Cup
2007/08 - EHF Cup Winners' Cup
2008/09 - EHF Cup
2009/10 - EHF Challenge Cup

Matches

Famous players
 Marko Rajković
 Darko Stanić
 Alem Toskić
 Vesko Obradović

  Mirko Anđić

  Djordje Folić

 Vojislav Vukić

External links

Handball Federation of Montenegro
Balkan-handball 

Berane
Handball clubs established in 1949
1949 establishments in Yugoslavia
Berane